Henri Vilbert (6 April 1904 – 20 April 1997) was a French actor. He appeared in more than a hundred films from 1921 to 1982.

Filmography

References

External links
 

1904 births
1997 deaths
20th-century French male actors
French male film actors
French male television actors
Male actors from Marseille
Volpi Cup for Best Actor winners